Oceanside is a station serving the Long Beach Branch of the Long Island Rail Road. It is located at Weidner Avenue and Lawson Boulevard in Oceanside, New York.

History
Oceanside station opened in 1897 as part of the New York and Long Beach Railroad, which was merged into the LIRR in 1909. The station was rebuilt on May 1, 1915, and again in 1959, and 2002. While a station house exists, it also has sheltered platforms on both sides of the tracks.

Station layout
The station has two high-level side platforms, each eight cars long, and is wheelchair-accessible. The station house and parking lot are located east of inbound platform. There are four nearby parking lots, al restricted to residents of Oceanside. Parking permits are issued by the Town of Hempstead.

References

External links 

Unofficial LIRR History Website
Northbound -- February 1999
Views from tracks and Parking Lot --December 2006
Sheltered Platform -- December 2006
 Station from Anchor Avenue from Google Maps Street View
Platforms from Google Maps Street View
Station House (interior) from Google Maps Street View

Long Island Rail Road stations in Nassau County, New York
Railway stations in the United States opened in 1897
1897 establishments in New York (state)